Rafael Banquells (born Rafael Banquells Garafulla; 25 June 1917 – 27 October 1990) was a Cuban-born Mexican actor, director and TV producer known in Mexico as Rafael Banquells (I).

Biography 
Banquells was born on 25 June 1917 in La Habana, Cuba. His parents were actors in Spain. He began his career as a movies actor in 1940.  He was married three times. His wives were actresses. First he married Blanca de Castejón (deceased). He was then married to the actress and TV producer Silvia Pinal and they had a daughter, Sylvia Pasquel; and he was last married to the actress Dina de Marco. Their children are José Manuel, Rocío Banquells, Jeanette, Mary Paz, Ariadne and Rafael Jr..

Rafael died on 27 October 1990 in Mexico City, at the age of 73.

Filmography

As an actor

References

External links

1917 births
1990 deaths
People from Havana
Cuban male telenovela actors
Cuban male film actors
Cuban film directors
Cuban people of Catalan descent
20th-century Cuban male actors
Cuban emigrants to Mexico